This is a list of bestselling novels in the United States in the 1960s, as determined by Publishers Weekly. The list features the most popular novels of each year from 1960 through 1969.

The standards set for inclusion in the lists – which, for example, led to the exclusion of the novels in the Harry Potter series from the lists for the 1990s and 2000s – are currently unknown.

1960 
 Advise and Consent by Allen Drury
 Hawaii by James A. Michener
 The Leopard by Giuseppe Tomasi di Lampedusa
 The Chapman Report by Irving Wallace
 Ourselves to Know by John O'Hara
 The Constant Image by Marcia Davenport
 The Lovely Ambition by Mary Ellen Chase
 The Listener by Taylor Caldwell
 Trustee from the Toolroom by Nevil Shute
 Sermons and Soda-Water by John O'Hara

1961 
 The Agony and the Ecstasy by Irving Stone
 Franny and Zooey by J. D. Salinger
 To Kill a Mockingbird by Harper Lee
 Mila 18 by Leon Uris
 The Carpetbaggers by Harold Robbins
 Tropic of Cancer by Henry Miller
 Winnie Ille Pu by Alexander Lenard (Latin translation of Winnie the Pooh by A. A. Milne)
 Daughter of Silence by Morris West
 The Edge of Sadness by Edwin O'Connor
 The Winter of Our Discontent by John Steinbeck

1962 
 Ship of Fools by Katherine Anne Porter
 Dearly Beloved by Anne Morrow Lindbergh
 A Shade of Difference by Allen Drury
 Youngblood Hawke by Herman Wouk
 Franny and Zooey by J. D. Salinger
 Fail-Safe by Eugene Burdick and Harvey Wheeler
 Seven Days in May by Fletcher Knebel and Charles W. Bailey II
 The Prize by Irving Wallace
 The Agony and the Ecstasy by Irving Stone
 The Reivers by William Faulkner

1963 
 The Shoes of the Fisherman by Morris West
 The Group by Mary McCarthy
 Raise High the Roof Beam, Carpenters, and Seymour-An Introduction by J. D. Salinger
 Caravans by James A. Michener
 Elizabeth Appleton by John O'Hara
 Grandmother and the Priests by Taylor Caldwell
 City of Night by John Rechy
 The Glass-Blowers by Daphne du Maurier
 The Sand Pebbles by Richard McKenna
 The Battle of the Villa Fiorita by Rumer Godden

1964 
 The Spy Who Came in from the Cold by John le Carré
 Candy by Terry Southern and Mason Hoffenberg
 Herzog by Saul Bellow
 Armageddon by Leon Uris
 The Man by Irving Wallace
 The Rector of Justin by Louis Auchincloss
 The Martyred by Richard E. Kim
 You Only Live Twice by Ian Fleming
 This Rough Magic by Mary Stewart
 Convention by Fletcher Knebel and Charles W. Bailey II

1965 
 The Source by James A. Michener
 Up the Down Staircase by Bel Kaufman
 Herzog by Saul Bellow
 The Looking Glass War by John le Carré
 The Green Berets by Robin Moore
 Those Who Love by Irving Stone
 The Man with the Golden Gun by Ian Fleming
 Hotel by Arthur Hailey
 The Ambassador by Morris West
 Don't Stop the Carnival by Herman Wouk

1966 
 Valley of the Dolls by Jacqueline Susann
 The Adventurers by Harold Robbins
 The Secret of Santa Vittoria by Robert Crichton
 Capable of Honor by Allen Drury
 The Double Image by Helen MacInnes
 The Fixer by Bernard Malamud
 Tell No Man by Adela Rogers St. Johns
 Tai-Pan by James Clavell
 The Embezzler by Louis Auchincloss
 All in the Family by Edwin O'Connor

1967 
 The Arrangement by Elia Kazan
 The Confessions of Nat Turner by William Styron
 The Chosen by Chaim Potok  (N.B. The source shows the Styron and Potok books tied for 2 and 3.)
 Topaz by Leon Uris
 Christy by Catherine Marshall
 The Eighth Day by Thornton Wilder
 Rosemary's Baby by Ira Levin
 The Plot by Irving Wallace
 The Gabriel Hounds by Mary Stewart
 The Exhibitionist by Henry Sutton

1968 
 Airport by Arthur Hailey
 Couples by John Updike
 The Salzburg Connection by Helen MacInnes
 A Small Town in Germany by John le Carré
 Testimony of Two Men by Taylor Caldwell
 Preserve and Protect by Allen Drury
 Myra Breckinridge by Gore Vidal
 Vanished by Fletcher Knebel
 Christy by Catherine Marshall
 The Tower of Babel by Morris West

1969 
 Portnoy's Complaint by Philip Roth
 The Godfather by Mario Puzo
 The Love Machine by Jacqueline Susann
 The Inheritors by Harold Robbins
 The Andromeda Strain by Michael Crichton
 The Seven Minutes by Irving Wallace
 Naked Came the Stranger by Penelope Ashe
 The Promise by Chaim Potok
 The Pretenders by Gwen Davis
 The House on the Strand by Daphne du Maurier

References

1960s in the United States
Novels
1960s books